Road signs in Mongolia are similar to the Soviet (post-Soviet states), British, and other European road sign systems. They ensure that transport vehicles move safely and in an orderly manner, and inform the participants of traffic built-in graphic icons. These icons are governed by the Vienna Convention on Road Traffic and Vienna Convention on Road Signs and Signals.

Road sign

Warning signs

Prohibitory signs

Priority signs

Mandatory signs

Guide signs

Service signs

Supplementary signs

References

Mongolia
Road transport in Mongolia